Measure of a Man may refer to:

Film and television  
 The Measure of a Man (1915 film), an American lost silent drama film directed by Joe De Grasse and featuring Lon Chaney
 The Measure of a Man (1916 film), an American silent drama film directed by Jack Conway
 The Measure of a Man (1924 film), an American silent drama film directed by Arthur Rosson
 The Measure of a Man (2015 film), a French film directed by Stéphane Brizé
 Measure of a Man (film), a 2018 American film
 "The Measure of a Man" (Star Trek: The Next Generation), a 1989 television episode

Literature 
 The Measure of a Man: A Spiritual Autobiography, a 2000 book by Sidney Poitier
 The Measure of a Man, a 1959 book by Martin Luther King Jr.

Music 
 Measure of a Man (Clay Aiken album) or the title song, 2003
 Measure of a Man (Kevin Sharp album) or the title song, 1996
 "Measure of a Man" (Jack Ingram song), 2007
 "Measure of a Man" (Sam and Mark song), 2003
 "Measure of a Man", a song by FKA Twigs, 2021
 "The Measure of a Man", a song by Elton John from the soundtrack of the film Rocky V, 1990

See also
Measure of Man a 2006 Singaporean Mandarin-language TV series
The Measure of Man, a 2011 Estonian English-language documentary film
The Mismeasure of Man, a 1981 book by Stephen Jay Gould